is a series of shoot 'em up video games developed by Success. The series debuted with Cotton: Fantastic Night Dreams in 1991 and has spanned a history of releases in arcades and on consoles. The Cotton games helped establish the cute 'em up subgenre. Instead of warships and battlefields typical of most shoot 'em ups, Cotton games put players in control of a witch riding on a broom and tasks them with fighting through magical haunted kingdoms. Seven games were released between 1991 and 2003. Following an 18-year gap, the series was reintroduced with Cotton Reboot! and Cotton Fantasy: Superlative Night Dreams (titled Cotton Rock 'n' Roll: Superlative Night Dreams in Japan) in 2021.

Games

Series overview 
The games in the Cotton series follows a young witch named Cotton who has an addiction to Willow. She is accompanied by the fairy Silk. Most of the games in the Cotton series are side scrolling shooting games.  Cotton is classified as a "Cute 'em up", which is a sub-genre of shmups that tend to have unusual, oftentimes completely bizarre opponents for the player to fight. The character Silk functions similar to the "options" from the Gradius series. Rainbow Cotton is the first game in the series to be fully 3D.

Each Cotton game features a unique story that is loosely connected to the other games in the series. All of these stories revolve around the obsession of a young witch named Nata de Cotton with a magical type of candy called "Willow". Cotton is a red-haired pre-teen witch with a hunger for Willow candy that drives all of her actions. She is hot-headed, immature, and often overreacts. Although her quests in each game are ultimately to serve a higher purpose, she is never involved personally for any reason other than the prospect of getting to eat a Willow. In a typical Cotton game, Cotton will embark on her journey through the game's stages with the hope that she will be rewarded with a Willow at the end. However, when the game is over, she almost always winds up empty-handed.

Other appearances

The main character Cotton has had appearances in other works:

 Rondo of Swords: Although not a Cotton game specifically, the willow obsessed witch joins your party in this strategy role-playing title, also made by Success.
 Trouble Witches Origin - Episode 1: Daughters of Amalgam: The first time Cotton has appeared with her classic gameplay in nearly a couple of decades, her first video game appearance anywhere in a decade and the first time she has been in a video game not developed by her company of origin, Success. A game centering around witches and is similarly in the shmup genre, Cotton tags along as a DLC character. This also marks the first appearance of the fairy Silk since Rainbow Cotton nearly a couple of decades ago.
 Umihara Kawase Fresh! Cotton makes an appearance as a playable character.
 In 1994 Cotton - Minakami Hiroki is part of Gamest Comics Collection.
 In 2012, A manga titled Toriaezu supīdoappu demo shite oku no Kokoro! (とりあえずスピードアップでもしておくのココロ！?)

References

External links
Success 40th Anniversary page for Cotton

Video game franchises
Video game franchises introduced in 1991
Horizontally scrolling shooters
Success (company) games
Video games featuring female protagonists
Video games about witchcraft
Cotton (series)